Miroslav Cvijanović (born 14 May 1985) is a former Slovenian footballer. He played for Primorje, Bilje, Olimpija Ljubljana, Krka, and Kras Repen.

Personal life
He is a cousin of Goran Cvijanović, who is also a former footballer.

References

External links
Player profile at PrvaLiga 

1985 births
Living people
People from Nova Gorica
Slovenian footballers
Slovenia youth international footballers
Association football defenders
NK Primorje players
NK Olimpija Ljubljana (2005) players
NK Krka players
Slovenian PrvaLiga players
Slovenian Second League players
Slovenian expatriate footballers
Slovenian expatriate sportspeople in Italy
Expatriate footballers in Italy